Harry Cyril Delevanti (23 February 1889 – 13 December 1975) was an English character actor with a long career in American films. He was sometimes credited as Syril Delevanti.

Early years
Delevanti was born in London to the Anglo-Italian music professor, Edward Prospero Richard Delevanti and his wife, Mary Elizabeth (née Rowbotham).

Career 
Delevanti had a career as an actor on the English stage and, after his emigration to the United States in 1921, performed on the American stage throughout the 1920s.  His first film appearance was in Devotion (1931). In 1938 he appeared in Red Barry for director Ford Beebe, who would later marry Delevanti's daughter, Kitty, thus becoming the actor's son-in-law. From the 1940s, he appeared in many small roles, frequently uncredited, in such films as Phantom of the Opera (1943), Confidential Agent (1945), Deception (1946), Monsieur Verdoux (1947), Forever Amber (1947), David and Bathsheba (1951), Limelight (1952), Les Girls (1957), Bye Bye Birdie (1963), and Mary Poppins (1964).

In 1958, Delevanti was cast as the printer Lucius Coin in all twenty-six episodes of the NBC western television series, Jefferson Drum, starring Jeff Richards. He made two guest appearances on Perry Mason during the first and final (ninth) seasons of the series. In 1957 he played florist Mr. Tulloch in "The Case of the Silent Partner". In 1965, he played bookie Craig Jefferson in "The Case of the Silent Six".

Delevanti made guest-starring appearances on Dennis the Menace; US Marshal; The Fugitive; Gunsmoke; Have Gun, Will Travel; The Tall Man; Bourbon Street Beat; Voyage to the Bottom of the Sea; The Virginian; Daniel Boone; Alfred Hitchcock Presents; Mission: Impossible; Ironside; The Untouchables; Science Fiction Theater; Adventures of Superman; The Twilight Zone (in the episodes "A Penny for Your Thoughts"; "The Silence"; "Passage on the Lady Anne"; and "A Piano in the House"); Dundee and the Culhane; Peter Gunn; and Dragnet. 

He continued to act in films, such as The Night of the Iguana (1964, nominated for a Golden Globe Award as Best Supporting Actor), Mary Poppins (1964), The Killing of Sister George (1968), and Bedknobs and Broomsticks (1971).

Personal life 
In 1913, Delevanti married Eva Kitty Peel; they had three children: Kitty, Cyril, and Harry. In the early 1950s, they operated a toy shop in the Los Angeles area.

Death
On 13 December 1975, Delevanti died in Hollywood of lung cancer. He is interred at Forest Lawn Memorial Park Cemetery, Glendale, California.

Credited filmography

Devotion (1931) – Reporter (uncredited)
Arrowsmith (1931) – committee member (uncredited)
Red Barry (1938, Serial) – Wing Fu 
A Dispatch from Reuter's (1940) – Cockney News Vendor (uncredited)
Man Hunt (1941) – Cab Driver (uncredited)
Confirm or Deny (1941) – Bellhop (scenes deleted)
Night Monster (1942) – Torque
Journey for Margaret (1942) – Stage Manager (uncredited)
When Johnny Comes Marching Home (1942) – Professor (uncredited)
The Adventures of Smilin' Jack (1943, Serial) – Mah Ling / Han Po
Frankenstein Meets the Wolf Man (1943) – Freddy Jolly—Graverobber (uncredited)
All by Myself (1943) – Mr. Vincent (uncredited)
Two Tickets to London (1943) – Scottish Man (uncredited)
Phantom of the Opera (1943) – Bookkeeper (uncredited)
Holy Matrimony (1943) – Townsman (uncredited)
Son of Dracula (1943) – Dr. Peters, the Coroner (uncredited)
The Lodger (1944) – Stagehand (uncredited)
The Impostor (1944) – Bartender (uncredited)
Phantom Lady (1944) – Claude (uncredited)
Her Primitive Man (1944) – Scientist (uncredited)
The Invisible Man's Revenge (1944) – Malty Bill – Shopkeeper (uncredited)
Shadow of Suspicion (1944) – Mr. Lewis (uncredited)
Ministry of Fear (1944) – Railroad Agent (uncredited)
Enter Arsène Lupin (1944) – Wine Expert (uncredited)
Double Exposure (1944) – Henry – Waiter (uncredited)
Jungle Queen (1945) – Rogers (uncredited)
The Jade Mask (1945) – Roth
Sherlock Holmes and the House of Fear (1945) – Stanley Raeburn (uncredited)
The Phantom of 42nd Street (1945) – Roberts
The Shanghai Cobra (1945) – Detective Larkin (uncredited)
The Fatal Witness (1945) – Second Coroner (uncredited)
Scotland Yard Investigator (1945) – Police Surgeon (uncredited)
Kitty (1945) – All Hot Hawker (uncredited)
This Love of Ours (1945) – Secretary (uncredited)
Confidential Agent (1945) – Businessman (uncredited)
Captain Tugboat Annie (1945) – Fred
The Daltons Ride Again (1945) – Jennings (uncredited)
Three Strangers (1946) – Stockbroker (voice, uncredited)
The Shadow Returns (1946) – John Adams
Lost City of the Jungle (1946, Serial) – Representative to Peace Foundation [Ch. 1] (uncredited)
Dressed to Kill (1946) – Convict at Dartmoor Prison (uncredited)
The Mysterious Mr. M (1946) – Prof. Jackson Parker (uncredited)
Deception (1946) – Beggar (uncredited)
I'll Be Yours (1947) – Businessman (uncredited)
Monsieur Verdoux (1947) – Postman (uncredited)
Lured (1947) – Medical Examiner (uncredited)
Forever Amber (1947) – Cobbler (uncredited)
The Emperor Waltz (1948) – Diplomat (uncredited)
David and Bathsheba (1951) – Undetermined Minor Role (uncredited)
Limelight (1952) – Griffin – a Clown (uncredited)
D-Day the Sixth of June (1956) – Coat Room Attendant (uncredited)
Johnny Tremain (1957) – Mr. Robert Newman (uncredited) 
Trooper Hook (1957) – Junius
Les Girls (1957) – Fanatic with 'What Is Truth' Sign (uncredited)
Ride Out for Revenge (1957) – Preacher
Sabu and the Magic Ring (1957) – Abdul
Gun Fever (1958) – Jerry
Teacher's Pet (1958) – Copy Man (uncredited)
Kings Go Forth (1958) – Blairs' Butler (uncredited)
I Bury the Living (1958) – William Isham (uncredited)
From the Terrace (1960) – MacHardie's Secretary (uncredited)
Paradise Alley (1962) – Grandpa
Dead Ringer (1964) – Henry, the Butler
The Night of the Iguana (1964) – Nonno
Mary Poppins (1964) – Mr. Grubbs (uncredited)
The Greatest Story Ever Told (1965) – Melchior
Oh Dad, Poor Dad, Mamma's Hung You in the Closet and I'm Feelin' So Sad (1967) – Hawkins
Counterpoint (1968) – Tartzoff
The Killing of Sister George (1968) – Ted Baker
Macho Callahan (1970) – Old man
Bedknobs and Broomsticks (1971) – Elderly Farmer
Soylent Green (1973) – Book # 4
The Girl Most Likely to... (1973) – Chaplain
Black Eye (1974) – Talbot (final film role)

References

External links

 
 

1889 births
1975 deaths
Deaths from lung cancer in California
English male film actors
English male television actors
Male actors from London
English people of Italian descent
Burials at Forest Lawn Memorial Park (Glendale)
British expatriate male actors in the United States
20th-century English male actors
English emigrants to the United States